Manchester North Eastern is a parliamentary constituency represented in the House of Representatives of the Jamaican Parliament. It elects one Member of Parliament (MP) by the first past the post system of election. It is located in Manchester Parish. The current MP is Mikael Phillips.

References 

Parliamentary constituencies of Jamaica
Manchester Parish